George Walter Murphy (April 22, 1963 – June 5, 2021) was a Canadian politician, who served in the Newfoundland and Labrador House of Assembly from 2011 to 2015. He represented the electoral district of St. John's East for the Newfoundland and Labrador New Democratic Party.

Politics

Murphy first ran for election as a Liberal candidate in the district of St. John's East in the 2003 election, placing second with 14.56 per cent of the vote.

In November 2010 Murphy decided to leave the Liberal party and run for the NDP nomination in the Conception Bay East-Bell Island by-election. Murphy placed second and received 26.14 per cent of the vote.

In the 2011 provincial election Murphy ran as the NDP candidate in St. John's East. Murphy garnered 52.11 per cent of the vote to win the seat.

On June 22, 2015, Murphy announced he would not be reoffering in the 2015 election. Part of Murphy's district of St. John's East had been redistricted with fellow NDP MHA Lorraine Michael's seat; Michael successfully ran in the new district. Murphy returned to his previous career as a taxi driver following the 2015 election.

Murphy has been the spokesperson of the Consumer Group for Fair Gas Prices since 2006, and regularly appeared in St. John's area media as a commentator on local gas prices. Murphy distanced himself from the NDP after leaving office.

In 2018, Murphy attended the NL Liberals' annual general meeting and stated that he supported the Liberals and Premier Dwight Ball.

Murphy contested the 2019 provincial election as the Liberal candidate in St. John's East-Quidi Vidi but lost to NDP leader Alison Coffin.

In 2021, Murphy unsuccessfully ran as the Liberal candidate in Harbour Main for the 2021 provincial election.

Murphy died of a heart attack on the evening June 5, 2021 at his Seal Cove residence.

Electoral record

|-

|NDP
|George Murphy
|align="right"|2,766
|align="right"|52.11%
|align="right"|
|-

|-

|}

}

 
|NDP
|George Murphy
|align="right"|1,043
|align="right"|26.20%
|align="right"|+15.96%

|}

 
|NDP
|Bruce Clarke
|align="right"|864
|align="right"|14.54
|align="right"|

|-

|Independent
|Steve Durant
|align="right"|66
|align="right"|1.11
|align="right"|
|}

References

1963 births
2021 deaths
Newfoundland and Labrador New Democratic Party MHAs
Politicians from St. John's, Newfoundland and Labrador
Canadian taxi drivers
21st-century Canadian politicians